Àrd Bheinn (meaning "high mountain") is a small mountain of 1678 feet on central Isle of Arran in western Scotland.

Mountains and hills of the Southern Highlands
Mountains and hills of the Isle of Arran